Paddle sport(s), or Paddlesport(s), might refer to;

 Paddling, sports that involve the use of paddles to propel a watercraft
 Paddle sports, any racket sport that uses a paddle rather than a stringed racket